Soliman is a surname. Notable people with the surname include:

 Angelo Soliman (1721–1796), Austrian intellectual
 Azza Soliman (born 1968), Egyptian lawyer and women's rights activist
 Karam Soliman (born 1944), American-Egyptian pharmacologist
 Soliman Abdel-hady Soliman, Egyptian professor of Electrical Engineering
 Sam Soliman (born 1973), Australian boxer
 Ahmed Soliman (born 1965), former Egyptian basketball player
 Walid Soliman (writer) (born 1975), Tunisian writer, essayist and translator
 Walid Soliman (footballer) (born 1984), Egyptian football player